Stevens Creek is a waterway near Lincoln in eastern Nebraska in the Great Plains region of the United States. Stevens Creek is a tributary of Salt Creek which is itself a tributary of the Platte River.

See also

 List of rivers of Nebraska

References

Rivers of Nebraska
Rivers of Lancaster County, Nebraska